The Ontario Institute of Audio Recording Technology (OIART) is a private career college in London, Ontario, Canada.  The institute trains audio engineers for a variety of careers in music production, recording arts, audio engineering, sound recording and related fields.  Founded in 1983 by engineer and producer Paul Steenhuis, the college focuses solely on sound. Graduates of the OIART program receive a Diploma in Audio Recording Technology.

OIART has been described as "prestigious" and as "the Harvard of Audio Engineering" and attracts students from around the world.

Although not accredited, the school is registered as legally required by the Ontario Ministry of Training, Colleges and Universities. OIART has the largest full-time faculty of any audio school in Canada.

Curriculum

OIART offers an intensive, practical program in audio engineering. The 1300-hour program is taught in the school's seven digital multi-track equipped studios, including two lecture-style theatres. The school features an overall 5:1 student-to-instructor ratio. In lab settings the student-to-instructor ratio is 4:1 and in tutorials the ratio is 1:1. There is one hour of lab for each hour of classroom instruction. All instructors are audio professionals. Graduates typically log more than 600 hours of studio experience during the course.

In 2006 OIART added video game sound production to its curriculum and became the first audio education program in North America to be registered as a game developer with Creative Labs.

Graduation rate and employment prospects

OIART has a completion rate that is significantly higher than the provincial average, with 90 percent of students graduating. This compares with 72.9 percent for the rest of Ontario's private colleges.  More than 93 percent of graduates were employed within six months compared with 79.4 percent provincially in 2004-2005.

Graduates have pursued entry-level career opportunities as:

Notable alumni

Dan Brodbeck, Producer
Haluk Kurosman, Co-Founder, GRGDN (Turkish Recording Label)
Siegfried Meier : Recording, Mixing and Mastering engineer, Studio Owner, Musician
Rob Nokes, President & Founder, Sounddogs.com
Mike Tompkins, YouTube personality & Acapella Producer

See also
Audio Engineering Society
Society of Professional Audio Recording Services

References

External links

Private colleges in Ontario
Audio engineering schools